Tătărani is a commune in Dâmbovița County, Muntenia, Romania with a population of 5,376 people. It is composed of four villages: Căprioru, Gheboieni, Priboiu, and Tătărani.

The commune is situated in a hilly area between the Wallachian Plain and the Southern Carpathians. It lies on the banks of the Dâmbovița River; the river Aninoasa discharges into the Dâmbovița in Căprioru village.

Tătărani is located in the northwestern part of Dâmbovița County,  from the county seat, Târgoviște, on the border with Argeș County. It is traversed on the left bank of the Dâmbovița River by national road , which connects Târgoviște to Câmpulung.

References

Communes in Dâmbovița County
Localities in Muntenia